The Ministry of National Planning and Economic Development (abbreviated MNPED) administers Burma's economic development and national planning policies.

MNPED is currently led by Kan Zaw, who was appointed by President Thein Sein on 7 September 2012. Prior to his appointment, he had been serving as  a deputy minister since March 2011.

History 
After 1948, the new government organized the Ministry of National Planning to rebuilt the country.

The ministry is composed with Ministry of Industry, Ministry of Religious Affairs and Union Culture and Ministry of Defence. In 1964, it became reserve as Ministry of National Planning. In those years, the ministry performed as National Planning Board, Economic Planning Board, Economic and Social Board.

On March 15, 1972, it was composed with Ministry of Finance and Taxas Ministry of Planning and Finance. On February 17, 1993, the Ministry of Planning and Finance was organized as the Ministry of National Planning and Economic Development and Ministry of Finance and Tax.

On March 30, 2016, the president Htin Kyaw composed those two ministries as Ministry of Planning and Finance.

See also
 Economy of Burma
 Cabinet of Burma

References

External links
 Official website

NationalPlanning
Myanmar
Myanmar